Eucalyptus cambageana, commonly known as the Dawson River blackbutt, Dawson gum or Coowarra box,<ref name="ABRS">{{cite web |last1=Chippendale |first1=George M. |title=Eucalyptus cambageana |url=https://profiles.ala.org.au/opus/foa/profile/Eucalyptus%20cambageana |publisher=Australian Biological Resources Study, Department of the Environment and Energy, Canberra |access-date=5 April 2019}}</ref> is a species of tree that is endemic to Queensland, Australia. It is a medium-sized tree with hard, rough bark on the lower trunk, smooth white to cream-coloured bark above, lance-shaped or curved adult leaves, flower buds in groups of seven, white flowers and cup-shaped to funnel-shaped fruit.

The bark on the lowest  of the trunk is hard, rough, dark grey to black then abruptly changes above to smooth, white to grey bark. Flowering occurs between July and September and the flowers are white.

Taxonomy and namingEucalyptus cambageana was first formally described in 1913 by Joseph Maiden described from a specimen collected in 1912 from Mirtna Station near Charters Towers. The specific epithet (cambageana) honours  surveyor and botanist Richard Hind Cambage.

Distribution and habitat
Dawson River blackbutt is found from near Charleville, Charters Towers and Jericho to the coast of Queensland. It grows in scrubland or open woodland with brigalow (Acacia harpophylla), belah (Casuarina cristata), and wilga (Geijera parviflora).  These open woodland communities where it is co-dominant with brigalow are found on clay, alluvial, or sedimentary soils.

The presence of E. cambageana'' is an indicator of sodic soil, which has implications for agriculture in the region.

Conservation
This eucalypt is classed as "least concern" under the Queensland Government Nature Conservation Act 1992.

Uses
The heavy reddish-brown timber of this eucalypt is used for fence posts in the local area. It grows into too large a tree for gardens in general, but its contrasting bark give it horticultural potential for parks and acreage.

See also
List of Eucalyptus species

References

cambageana
Flora of Queensland
Drought-tolerant trees
Myrtales of Australia
Plants described in 1914
Taxa named by Joseph Maiden